David Hobart (born 5 February 1936) is a Canadian bobsledder. He competed in the four-man event at the 1964 Winter Olympics.

References

External links
 

1936 births
Living people
Canadian male bobsledders
Olympic bobsledders of Canada
Bobsledders at the 1964 Winter Olympics
Place of birth missing (living people)